Quirindi railway station is a heritage-listed railway station located on the Main Northern line in Quirindi in the Liverpool Plains Shire local government area of New South Wales, Australia. The station serves the town of Quirindi and opened on 13 August 1877 when the line was extended from Murrurundi. It was the terminus of the line until it was extended to West Tamworth on 14 October 1878. It is also known as Quirindi Railway Station group. The railway station was added to the New South Wales State Heritage Register on 2 April 1999.

Services
Quirindi is served by NSW TrainLink's daily Northern Tablelands Xplorer service operating between Armidale/Moree and Sydney.

Description 
The complex comprises a type 1 brick combined residence and station building, completed in 1876; an open frame signal box set on a platform, completed in 1918; a corrugated iron outshed; and a brick platform face, completed in 1877.

Heritage listing 
Quirindi is one of the best examples of a combined residence/station building of which there are five extant, this being one of the best. It forms an important part of the main street of Quirindi and is of high significance in the State rail system.

Quirindi railway station was listed on the New South Wales State Heritage Register on 2 April 1999 having satisfied the following criteria.

The place possesses uncommon, rare or endangered aspects of the cultural or natural history of New South Wales.

This item is assessed as historically rare. This item is assessed as scientifically rare. This item is assessed as archaeologically rare. This item is assessed as socially rare.

See also

List of regional railway stations in New South Wales

References

Attribution

External links

Quirindi station details Transport for New South Wales

Easy Access railway stations in New South Wales
Railway stations in Australia opened in 1877
Regional railway stations in New South Wales
New South Wales State Heritage Register
Liverpool Plains Shire
Articles incorporating text from the New South Wales State Heritage Register
Main North railway line, New South Wales